George Colin Jackson (6 December 1921 – 19 April 1981) was a British Labour Party politician, barrister, lecturer and writer.

Having unsuccessfully fought King's Lynn in 1959, he was twice Member of Parliament for the marginal constituency of Brighouse and Spenborough, in West Yorkshire.  He was first elected at the 1964 general election, but at the 1970 election he lost his seat to the Conservative Wilfred Proudfoot, by a majority of only 59 votes. Jackson won the seat back at the February 1974 general election, held it in October 1974, and stood down at the 1979 general election.

References 
Times Guide to the House of Commons, October 1974

External links 
 

1921 births
1981 deaths
Labour Party (UK) MPs for English constituencies
Members of the Fabian Society
UK MPs 1964–1966
UK MPs 1966–1970
UK MPs 1974
UK MPs 1974–1979

fi:Colin Jackson